Grīnvalti is a village in the Nīca parish of Liepāja District, Latvia. Grīnvalti is located on the narrow strip of the land between the Baltic Sea and Liepāja lake, near the southern border of Liepāja.  Through it passes bus route Nr. 2092 (Liepāja - Nīca).  Grīnvalti mostly known because near it in the times of Latvian SSR was located 27th border guard battery.  As of 2007 in Grīnvalti is planned to build the modern residential settlement.

Towns and villages in Latvia